Hippity Hop is the debut extended play by South Korean girl group EXID. The album marked the first appearance of the group's new line-up. The lead single, "I Feel Good", was written and produced by Shinsadong Tiger.

Music video 
A teaser of the music video for "I Feel Good" was released on August 6. The full music video was released on August 14, 2012, along with the EP release.

Promotions 
In order to promote the album, EXID promote the single in various music programs. Promotions of the song "I Feel Good" started on August 17. EXID held their first comeback stage through KBS's Music Bank on August 17, 2012.

Chart performance
In South Korea, "I Feel Good" entered the Gaon Single Chart at number 56 during the week of August 13, 2012. During that week the song was downloaded 57,697 times. "I Feel Good" also appeared in the Gaon Monthly Chart. By the end of August, "I Feel Good" peaked at number 122 on Gaon Monthly Single Chart and had 110,103 downloads sold. By the end of the year 2012, the song was downloaded only 150,000 times.

Track listing

Charts

Sales

Credits and personnel
Shinsadong Tiger – executive producer co-producing
Heo Sol-ji - vocals
Ahn Hee-youn - vocals
Ahn Hyo-jin - vocals, rap
Park Jung-hwa - vocals
Seo Hye-lin - vocals

Release history

References

2012 debut EPs
Kakao M EPs
Korean-language EPs
EXID albums